Holmes' Bank was a bank in the British Crown dependency of the Isle of Man, providing private and business banking services to the local population. Holmes' Bank crashed spectacularly in 1853 resulting in hardship, unemployment, bankruptcy and destitution for many of the inhabitants of the Island.

History

Origins
The early history of banking on the Isle of Man is rife with incompetence and mismanagement. Whilst the earliest banks in England were an integral part in trading as far back as the 12th Century, banking was unknown on the Isle of Man until the beginning of the 19th Century.

The earliest Manx bank began business in 1802 at Castletown. It was known as the Isle of Man Bank and carried on trading until 1818. 
A feature of Manx life at that time was a profusion of bank notes in circulation issued by tradesmen for small amounts and an Act to control note issues was passed in 1817. Five bank licences were issued under this law.

The Bank of Wulff and Forbes opened in 1826 and was taken over 10 years later by the Isle of Man Joint Stock Banking Company, which ended in a disaster in 1843.
In 1836 the Isle of Man and Liverpool Banking Company was formed, being wound up two years later. Another bank, the Isle of Man Commercial Bank was also formed during the mid 1840s, being absorbed into the City of Glasgow Bank, which traded on the Isle of Man under the title Bank of Mona, which became the bank of the Isle of Man Government.

Formation
Holmes's Bank was set up by three brothers; John, Henry and James Holmes the bank's premises being situated on South Quay, Douglas. The brothers' Holmes were involved in various business ventures, ostensibly establishing themselves in the running of passenger and cargo shipping, banking being merely a subsidiary activity of what was virtually a general trading concern.

Operation
The brothers commenced their banking operation in 1815 the bank forming a reputation for soundness and stability, serving the people of the Isle of Man in a prudent manner up until 1845. However, in the years 1846 and 1847 the bank began involving itself in reckless trading speculations, chiefly involving Liverpool brokers paving the way to its subsequent collapse.

Failure
Henry Holmes died in 1848, the banking business and other concerns being carried on by his surviving brothers. Profligate practice continued resulting in the failure of Holmes' Bank in 1853, leaving liabilities of approximately £300,000.

Aftermath
The failure of Holmes' Bank caused acute misery and suffering on the Isle of Man. An investigation of the affairs of the bank disclosed that notes far in excess of the number authorised by licence had mysteriously got into circulation.

References

Banks established in 1815
British companies established in 1815
1815 establishments in the Isle of Man
1815 establishments in England
Defunct banks of the Isle of Man
Corporate scandals
Former investment banks
History of banking
Economic history of the United Kingdom
Bank failures
Accounting scandals
19th-century disestablishments in the Isle of Man
1853 disestablishments in England
British companies disestablished in 1853